Devonshire Street is a street in the City of Westminster, London. Adjoining Harley Street, it is known for the number of medical establishments it contains.

The street is named after the 5th Duke of Devonshire, who was related to the ground landlord, the Duke of Portland.

Location

Devonshire Street runs from Great Portland Street in the east to Marylebone High Street in the west. Beaumont Street, Devonshire Place Mews, Devonshire Place, Devonshire Mews West, Harley Street, Devonshire Mews North, Portland Place, Devonshire Row Mews, and Hallam Street all adjoin Devonshire Street on its north side.

On its south side, Beaumont Street, Dunstable Mews, Upper Wimpole Street, Devonshire Mews South, Harley Street, Devonshire Close, Portland Place, Bridford Mews, and Hallam Street all join Devonshire Street on its south side.

Buildings
The Royal Philatelic Society London was formerly located on the corner of Devonshire Street and Devonshire Place.

The Embassy of Chile in the United Kingdom was located in the street until 2009.

Gallery

References

External links 

 The Marylebone Association
 The Howard de Walden Estate
 Westminster City Council Harley Street Conservation Area Audit 2008
The tree lining of Devonshire Street which occurred in 2011

Streets in the City of Westminster
Marylebone